The Muay Thai competition at the 2019 Southeast Asian Games in the Philippines was held at the Subic Bay Exhibition and Convention Center in Subic Bay Freeport Zone, Zambales, Philippines from 3 to 8 December 2019.

Participating nations
A total of 45 athletes from 7 nations participated (the numbers of athletes are shown in parentheses).

Medal summary

Medal table

Waikru events

Men's events

Women's events

References

External links
 

2019
Southeast Asian Games
2019 Southeast Asian Games events